The Niedermünster or Niedermünster Abbey, Regensburg, was a house of canonesses (Frauenstift) in Regensburg, Bavaria, Germany. At the height of its power it was one of the wealthiest and most influential in Bavaria. The church is still in use as the parish church of Regensburg Cathedral.

History

This women's religious community, dedicated to Saint Erhard of Regensburg at its founding and later to the Assumption of the Virgin Mary as well, was recorded for the first time in about 889. However, the first church, if the traditional foundation by the seventh-century Saint Erhard is credited, would have already existed by about 700, and a religious community had been founded by 788 by Tassilo III, Duke of Bavaria. The foundation tradition also credits Saint Erhard with the foundation of a nunnery here. It is not clear in fact whether at first the community was for men or for women, but it soon developed into one of the most important women's religious houses in Germany.

The church was entirely rebuilt on a grand scale by Henry I, Duke of Bavaria, in about 950. Henry was buried here and his widow Judith, who by virtue of her and her husband's generous endowment of the community, is counted as the founder, took the veil here, became abbess and was herself buried here in 990.

This close connection with the ruling and Imperial Ottonian house made Niedermünster powerful and wealthy. The treasures of Niedermünster include the Rule of about 990 and the Uta Codex or Evangeliary of about 1025 with its casket of chased gold, commissioned by an abbess of Niedermünster and containing an illumination showing Saint Erhard presiding at Mass. There is also the magnificent cross given by Queen Gisela, daughter of Henry II, Duke of Bavaria, and wife of King Stephen I of Hungary, for the tomb of her mother, Duchess Gisela of Bavaria, who was buried here in 1006.

In 1002 Emperor Henry II, son of Henry II, Duke of Bavaria, granted the community Reichsfreiheit (territorial and judicial independence of all save the Emperor) and it became an Imperial abbey, or Reichsstift.

Emperor Henry II later favoured his own foundation of Bamberg Cathedral over Niedermünster, which accordingly lost prominence and influence.

The present Romanesque church was constructed after a fire in 1152 destroyed the previous one. The crypt of Saint Erhard remains from earlier buildings, however.

In the 17th and 18th centuries the church was modernised, although very modestly, and fitted out with some important works of art, including a monumental bronze crucifix and a sorrowing Mary Magdalene by Georg Petel. The silver shrine of the relics of Saint Erhard dates from the 19th century.

The community was dissolved in 1803 during the secularisation of Bavaria. From 1820 the premises were partly rented out. In 1821 the Bishop of Regensburg was given rooms here for his residence, and the episcopal offices were also transferred here. Also in 1821 the former canonry church took over from St. Ulrich's the role of cathedral parish church.

During excavations the foundations of Roman military buildings and predecessors of the church were uncovered. These may be seen only on guided tours, but it is planned to make these unique and well-preserved discoveries more accessible to the public.

Burials in Niedermünster include:
 Saint Erhard
 Blessed Albert of Cashel
 Henry I, Duke of Bavaria, his wife Judith, Duchess of Bavaria and their daughter-in-law Gisela of Burgundy, wife of Henry II, Duke of Bavaria

Abbesses of Niedermünster 

 Wildrade von Lernberg 900-928
 Tutta I von Reidenburg 928-942
 Himetrade von Hohenburg 942 – before 974
 Judith, Duchess of Bavaria 974-990
 Richenza I von Limburg 990-994
 Kunigunde I von Kirchberg 994-1002
 Uda I von Kirchberg 1002-1025
 Heilka I von Rothenburg 1025-1052
 Gertrud I von Hals 1052-1065
 Mathilde I von Luppurg 1065-1070
 Heilka II von Franken 1070-1089
 Uda II von Marburg 1089-1103
 Richenza II von Zolling 1103-1109
 Mathilde II von Kirchberg 1109-1116
 Richenza III von Abensberg 1116-1126
 Richenza IV von Dornburg 1126-1130
 Heilka III von Kirchberg 1130-1136
 Kunigunde II von Kirchberg 1136-1177
 Tutta II von Falkenstein 1177-1180
 Adelheid I von Wolffershausen 1180-1190
 Bertha von Frontenhausen 1190-1197
 Heilka IV von Rotheneck 1197-1218
 Heilka V von Wittelsbach 1218-1224
 Frideruna von Falkenstein 1224-1229
 Mathilde III von Henffenfeld 1229-1239
 Tutta III von Dalmässing 1239-1242
 Irmgard I von Scheyern 1242-1245
 Hildegard von Kirchberg 1245-1249
 Kunigunde III von Stein 1249-1257
 Kühnheit Pinzingerin 1257-1259 ?
 Wilburg von Lobsingen 1259 ?-1261
 Tutta IV von Putingen 1261-1264
 Gertrud II. von Stein 1264-1271
 Wilburg von Lobsingen 1271-1273 (again)
 Elisabeth I Stauffin von Stauffenburg 1273-1276
 Hedwig Kropflin 1276-1285
 Kunigunde IV Hainkhoverin 1285-1300
 Adelheid II von Treidenberg 1300-1304
 Irmgard II von Köfering 1304-1314
 Euphemia von Winzer 1314-1333
 Elisabeth II von Eschen 1333-1340
 Petrissa von Weidenberg 1340-1353
 Margarethe I Gösslin von Altenburg 1353-1361
 Margarethe II Pinzingerin 1361-1365
 Elisabeth III von Rhein 1365-1391
 Sophia von Daching 1391-1410
 Katharina I von Egloffstein 1410-1413
 Barbara I Höfferin 1413-1417
 Herzenleid von Wildenwarth 1417-1422
 Anna I von Streitberg 1422-1427
 Beatrix von Rotheneck 1427
 Osanna von Streitberg 1427-1444
 Ursula von Tauffkirchen-Hohenrain und Höchlenbach 1444-1448
 Ottilia von Abensberg 1448-1475 mit
 Margarethe III von Paulstorff 1469-1475
 Agnes von Rothafft 1475-1520
 Barbara II von Aham 1520-1569
 Anna II von Kirmbreith 1569-1598
 Katharina II Scheifflin 1598-1605
 Eva von Uhrhausen 1605-1616
 Anna Maria von Salis 1616-1652
 Maria Margarethe von Sigertshofen 1652-1675
 Maria Theresia von Muggenthal 1675-1693
 Regina Recordin von Rein und Hamberg 1693-1697
 Johanna Franziska Sibylla von Muggenthal 1697-1723
 Maria Katharina Helena von Aham-Neuhaus 1723-1757
 Anna Katharina von Dücker-Hasslen-Urstein-Winkel 1757-1768
 Anna Febronia Elisabeth von Speth-Zwyfalten 1769-1789
 Maria Franziska Xaveria von Königfeld 1789-1793
 Maria Violanta von Lerchenfeld-Premberg 1793-1801
 Maria Helena von Freien-Seiboltsdorf 1801-1803

See also

 Obermünster, Regensburg

Notes

Sources 
    Klöster in Bayern: Niedermünster, Regensburg
  Episcopal Offices, Regensburg
  Bibliography of the Nieder-, Ober- and Mittelmünster in Regensburg

Monasteries in Bavaria
Roman Catholic churches in Regensburg
Christian monasteries established in the 8th century
Bavarian Circle
Imperial abbeys disestablished in 1802–03
Burial sites of the Ottonian dynasty